Ōikari Tsuyoshi (born 16 June 1972 as Tsuyoshi Saito) is a former sumo wrestler from Kyoto, Japan. He made his professional debut in March 1995, and reached the top division in November 1998. His highest rank was maegashira 11. He retired in November 2004, and as of 2016 he is an elder in the Japan Sumo Association under the name Kabutoyama.

Career
He was an amateur sumo wrestler at Doshisha University and upon turning professional in 1995 was given makushita tsukedashi status, allowing him to begin in the third makushita division. He joined Isenoumi stable, where another Doshisha University graduate, Tosanoumi, had joined the previous year. He was given the shikona of Ōikari (literally "large anchor"). He was promoted to the jūryō division in May 1997, becoming the first sekitori from Kyoto Prefecture since the retirement of Daimonji in July 1973, and he was to win two jūryō division championships or yūshō in 1998 and 2001. He first reached the top makuuchi division in November 1998 but was demoted after only one tournament. He had two further stints the top division, a two tournament run in January and March 2000, and four tournaments from January until July 2002. His highest rank was maegashira 11 and he had an overall win/loss record in makuuchi of 45–60. He was demoted back to the makushita division in September 2004 and announced his retirement after the following tournament in November.

Retirement from sumo
Ōikari's danpatsu-shiki or official retirement ceremony was held in the ground floor of the Ryōgoku Kokugikan on May 28, 2005 with 230 invited guests including former ōzeki Musōyama. He has remained in sumo as a coach at Isenoumi stable under the elder name of Kabutoyama Oyakata. He has worked as a trainer and instructor in the sumo school for new recruits.

Fighting style
Ōikari was a pusher/thruster (tsuki/oshi) whose favourite techniques were oshi dashi (push out), tsuki otoshi (thrust over) and hiki otoshi (pull down).

Family
He was married in March 2004. His son Chugo Saito (斎藤 忠剛) was born in 2006 and has competed in primary school amateur sumo at the Wanpaku Tournament (Grade 4 in 2016 and Grade 5 in 2017).

Career record

See also
List of sumo tournament second division champions
Glossary of sumo terms
List of past sumo wrestlers
List of sumo elders

References

External links

1972 births
Living people
Japanese sumo wrestlers
Sumo people from Kyoto Prefecture